Mongsang (also known as Maingsin) was a Shan state in what is today Burma.

History
Mongsang became independent from Hsenwi in 1857 under a personal union with the neighbouring state of Monghsu. It was a tributary of Burma until 1887, when the Shan states submitted to British rule after the fall of the Konbaung dynasty.

Rulers
The rulers of Möngsang/Monghsu bore the title of Myoza.

Myozas
1857 - 1879                Hkun Mon
1879 - 1901                Hkun Maha 
1901 - 1917                Hkun Kyaw                          (b. 1845 - d. 1917)
1917 - 19..                Hkun Sao (Hkun Saw)                (b. 1845 - d. 19..)

References

External links
"Gazetteer of Upper Burma and the Shan states"
The Imperial Gazetteer of India

Shan States
1857 establishments in Asia